Jesús Zavala (born Jesús Esparza Zavala on September 16, 1991, in Guadalajara, Jalisco) is a Mexican actor and singer.

Biography 
He first appeared on the reality TV show Código F.A.M.A. that launched his career as a singer and an actor. He has since appeared on telenovelas such as Alegrijes y Rebujos, Mision S.O.S, and Pablo y Andrea. Also, he worked in the telenovelas Atrevete a Soñar and Esperanza del Corazón.

Television 
Supertitlán (2022–) – Jonás Encinas
Club de Cuervos (2015–) – Hugo Sánchez
Esperanza del Corazón (2011–12) – Hugo Martinez "Wampi"
Atrevete a Soñar (2009)-(2010) – Roger
Querida Enemiga (2008) –  as Ivan
Pablo y Andrea (2005) – Nicolas
Misión S.O.S (2004–05) – Chaneque
Alegrijes y rebujos (2003–04) – Esteban Dominguez
Codigo F.A.M.A. (2003) – as himself

Film 
All Inclusive (2008) – Andres
"Malaventura" (2011) – Damian Martínez
"La Boda de Valentina" (2018) – Bernardo
"Dime Cuando Tú" (2020) – Will

References

External links

1991 births
Living people
Mexican male child actors
Mexican male telenovela actors
Singers from Guadalajara, Jalisco
Male actors from Jalisco
Singers from Jalisco
21st-century Mexican singers
Male actors from Guadalajara, Jalisco
21st-century Mexican male singers